This page includes a list of biblical proper names that start with C in English transcription. Some of the names are given with a proposed etymological meaning. For further information on the names included on the list, the reader may consult the sources listed below in the References and External Links.

A – B – C – D – E – F – G – H – I – J – K – L – M – N – O – P – Q – R – S – T – U – V – Y – Z

C

Ca 
 Cabbon
 Cabul
 Caesar
 Cainan, Kenan, acquisition
 Cain acquisition, fabrication
 Caiphas
 Calah
 Calcol
 Caleb-Ephratah
 Caleb, bold, impetuous
 Calem
 Calneh
 Calno
 Calvary
 Camon, "derivation uncertain"
 Canaan
 Cana
 Candace
 Capernaum
 Caphtor
 Cappadocia
 Carcas
 Careah, bald
 Carmel
 Carmi
 Carpus
 Charchemish
Carshena, meaning uncertain
Casiphia, silversmith
 Casluhim
 Castiel

Ce 
 Cedron
 Cenchrea
 Cephas
 Cesar
 Cesia

Ch 
 Chalcol, meaning uncertain
 Charran
 Chebar
 Chedorlaomer
 Chelal
 Chelluh
 Chelubai
 Chelub
 Chemarims
 Chemosh
 Chenaanah
 Chenaniah
 Chenani
 Chephirah
 Cheran
 Cherith
 Chesed
 Chesil
 Chesulloth
 Chidon
 Chiliab
 Chilion
 Chilmad
 Chimham
 Chios
 Chisleu, Cisleu, Casleu
 Chislon
 Chisloth-tabor
 Chittem
 Chloe, blooming, green plant 
 Chorath
 Chorazin
 Chozeba
Christ, anointed The Anointed One;
Christian
 Chun
 Chushan-rishathaim
 Chuza

Ci 
 Cilicia
 Cis

Cl 
 Clauda
 Claudia, Claudius, lame
 Clement, merciful
 Cleophas

Cn 
 Cnidus

Co 
 Colhozeh
 Colosse
 Coniah
 Coos
 Corinth
 Cornelius
 Cosam
 Coz

Cr 
 Crescens
 Crete
 Crispus

Cu 
 Cush, Cushan
 Cuth
 Cyprus

Cyril === 
 Cyrene
 Cyrenius
 Cyrus

References
Comay, Joan, Who's Who in the Old Testament, Oxford University Press, 1971, 
Lockyer, Herbert, All the men of the Bible, Zondervan Publishing House (Grand Rapids, Michigan), 1958
Lockyer, Herbert, All the women of the Bible, Zondervan Publishing 1988, 
Lockyer, Herbert, All the Divine Names and Titles in the Bible, Zondervan Publishing 1988, 
Tischler, Nancy M., All things in the Bible: an encyclopedia of the biblical world , Greenwood Publishing, Westport, Conn. : 2006

Online references

C